Moon 44 is a 1990 English-language German science fiction action film from Centropolis Film Productions, directed by Roland Emmerich and starring Michael Paré and Lisa Eichhorn alongside Brian Thompson and Malcolm McDowell. The film is set on a futuristic mining site on Moon 44, where convicts and teenage technicians are partnered. An undercover agent (Paré) must discover what has happened to missing corporate shuttles.

Plot 
By 2038, all of Earth's natural resources have been depleted. Multinational corporations have taken control of the galaxy and rival companies battle each other for access to mining planets. A major battle is for Moon 44, a fuel mining operation in the Outer Zone. It is the only installation still controlled by the Galactic Mining Corporation. Moons 46, 47 and 51 have recently been overtaken by the Pyrite Defense Company's battle robots. Galactic Mining had its own defense system, helicopters capable of operating in the violent atmospheres of the moons, but it was cancelled as too many pilots died while in training. The company sends new navigators to Moon 44 to assist the pilots. However, there is still a shortage of pilots, so the company is forced to use prisoners. Galactic Mining regards its fleet of mining shuttles as even more important, so if the base is attacked, the shuttles are ordered to leave the crews behind.

Galactic Mining hires Felix Stone, an undercover agent, to investigate the disappearance of two shuttles that went missing under mysterious circumstances. Stone travels to Moon 44 and meets chief navigator Tyler, who suspects the shuttles were stolen by somebody after they modified the flight computers. The mining operation's defence director, Major Lee and his assistant, Master Sergeant Sykes are the prime suspects. Stone later catches Sykes reprogramming a mining shuttle shortly before its departure. Sykes attacks Stone with an axe, but is quickly gunned down by Lee, who then refuses to hand over the modified computer to Stone, citing "company orders".

Having concluded his investigation, Stone prepares to leave, but the mining operation is attacked by a Pyrite Medusa-class battle cruiser. Major Lee sabotaged the alarm systems and then orders all of the mining shuttles to return to Earth. Stone manages to single-handedly shoot down the entire first wave of enemy attack drones, while prisoner O'Neal stays behind to destroy the remaining drones as Lee's actions at the base are discovered.

Lee tries to sabotage the last remaining mining shuttle, but he is trapped in an elevator by Stone and blown up by his own bomb. The others return safely to Earth, where Stone informs the Galactic Mining chairman that Lee was bribed by Pyrite to redirect the mining shuttles to a planet in the Outer Zone.

Cast 
 Michael Paré as Felix Stone
 Lisa Eichhorn as Terry Morgan
 Dean Devlin as Tyler
 Brian Thompson as Jake O’Neal
 Leon Rippy as Master Sergeant Sykes
 Stephen Geoffreys as Cookie
 Malcolm McDowell as Major Lee
 Jochen Nickel as Scooter Bailey
 Roscoe Lee Browne as Chairman Hall.

Production 

The film was shot by cinematographer Karl Walter Lindenlaub and scored by composer Joel Goldsmith. It was filmed in color with Dolby Stereo sound.

Moon 44 is the first collaboration between Devlin and Emmerich. Emmerich ran out of money before he could shoot an important establishing shot, so he improvised using mirrors and the production crew as extras.

Release
Moon 44 was released in West Germany on February 15, 1990. The film was released direct-to-video in the United States.

Reception 
In a contemporary review, Variety referred to the film as "boring, uneventful" and "feeble sci-fi effort from West Germany".

Time Out wrote that "the film looks nice but unoriginal ... the model work is okay but laboured; the acting is stunningly mediocre."  TV Guide rated it 1/5 stars and wrote, "It's eye-filling, to say the least, but there's not much tension or sense of danger."  Kim Newman of Empire rated it 2/5 stars and wrote, "The plot unravels in unwieldy dollops, and, despite some adequate special effects (for the time), the whole thing is really a bit of a bore."

References

Footnotes

Sources

External links 
 
 
 

1990 films
1990 action thriller films
1990 independent films
1990s science fiction action films
West German films
German independent films
German science fiction action films
1990s English-language films
English-language German films
Cyberpunk films
German dystopian films
1990s prison films
Space adventure films
Warner Bros. films
Films directed by Roland Emmerich
Films scored by Joel Goldsmith
Films set in 2038
Mining in space
1990s German films
1990s dystopian films